The flag of Texas is the official flag of the U.S. state of Texas. It is well known for its prominent single white star which gives the flag its commonly-used name: "Lone Star Flag". This lone star, in turn, gives rise to the state's nickname: "The Lone Star State". The flag, flown at homes and businesses statewide, is highly popular among Texans and is treated with a great degree of reverence and esteem within Texas. Along with the flag of Hawaii, it is one of two state flags to have previously served as a national flag of an independent country. In 2001, the North American Vexillological Association surveyed its members on the designs of the 72 U.S. state, territorial, and Canadian provincial flags and ranked the Texas flag second, behind New Mexico.

Flag design
The state flag is officially described by law as:

History and adoption

Legislation authorizing the flag was introduced in the Congress of the Republic of Texas on December 28, 1838, by Senator William H. Wharton. The flag was adopted on January 25, 1839, as the national flag of the Republic of Texas. "Accompanying the original Act ... is a drawing by Peter Krag of the national flag and seal ... although in the original President Lamar's approval and signature are at the top and upside down[.]"  When Texas became the 28th U.S. state on December 29, 1845, the national flag became the state flag. From 1879 until 1933 there was no official state flag, although the Lone Star Flag remained the de facto state flag; in adopting the Revised Civil Statutes of 1879, the Legislature repealed all statutes not expressly continued in force; since the statutes pertaining to the flag were not among those renewed, Texas was formally flagless until the passage of the 1933 flag law.

The actual designer of the flag is unknown.  Some claim that Dr. Charles B. Stewart of Montgomery, Texas, is either the designer of the flag or drew the image used by the Third Congress when enacting the legislation adopting the flag. However, Stewart's drawing "looks suspiciously like a tracing of the Peter Krag art, including the upside down signature of President Lamar".

Colors and symbolism
The exact shades of red, white, and blue to be used in the flag are specified by Texas statute to be the same as those of the flag of the United States, which are:

The Texas Flag Code assigns the following symbolism to the colors of the Texas flag: blue stands for loyalty, white for purity, and red for bravery. The code also states that the single (lone) star "represents ALL of Texas and stands for our unity as one for God, State, and Country".

The idea of the single red stripe and single white stripe actually dates back to the short-lived Republic of Fredonia, a small state near modern Nacogdoches which seceded from Mexico in 1826 before being forcibly re-integrated. The new state was formed through an alliance between local Anglo settlers and Native American tribes and the Fredonian flag used a white and red stripe to symbolize the two ethnic/racial groups from which the state was formed. Though this rebellion ultimately failed it served as an inspiration to the later Texas Revolution.

The idea of the "lone star" is, in fact, an older symbol predating the flag which was used to symbolize Texans' solidarity in declaring independence from Mexico.  A similar lone star was on the "Burnet Flag", which resembled the flag of the short-lived Republic of West Florida. The "Lone Star" is still seen today as a symbol of Texas' independent spirit, and gave rise to the state's official nickname "The Lone Star State".

Pledge of allegiance and flag protocol

The pledge of allegiance to the state flag is as follows:

The pledge was instituted by the Texas Legislature in 1933. The pledge originally referred to the "Texas flag of 1836" (which was the Burnet Flag, and not the Lone Star Flag then in use).  In 1965, the error was corrected by deleting the words "of 1836" because the current flag was not officially adopted by the Texas government until 1839.  In 2007, the phrase "one state under God" was added. The addition of "under God" has been challenged in court, though an injunction was denied.
As of 2001 (amended 2017), the pledge is recited standing at attention with one's right hand over one's heart. A person in uniform instead renders a military salute.  The Texas Pledge is always recited after reciting the Pledge of Allegiance to the American flag every morning in the majority of schools across the state.

The flag is required by law to be displayed on or near the main administration building of each state institution during each state or national holiday, and on any special occasion of historical significance, permanently above both doors of the Texas State Capitol, alone at the north door, and under the U.S. flag at the south door, with the exception being if the flags are at half mast or if the POW/MIA flag is being flown with the U.S. flag; in which event the Texas flag shall only fly at the North Door.  State law also requires that the state flag be flown at or near any International Port of Entry. When displayed vertically, the blue stripe should be at top and, from the perspective of an observer, the white stripe should be to the left of the red stripe.

Historical flags of Texas

National flags over Texas

Pre-Revolutionary flags

Revolutionary flags

During revolutionary eras of Texas history, during the Spanish Texas period, Mexican Texas period, and the times of the Texas Revolution, a great number and variety of flags appeared.

The Lone Star and Stripes/Ensign of the First Texas Navy/War Ensign flag was widely used by both Texan land and naval forces. This flag was simply the United States flag with a Lone star in the canton. This flag echoes an earlier design, carried by the forces of James Long in failed 1819 and 1821 attempts to separate Texas from Spanish control. This earlier flag was exactly the same, save for the canton having a red background rather than blue. There is evidence that the Lone Star and Stripes was used at the battles of Goliad, the Alamo, and San Jacinto, and the first Congress of the Republic of Texas as convened under it in 1836. Although interim President David Burnet issued a decree making the Lone Star and Stripes the first official flag of the Republic of Texas, it never became the legal national flag. It did remain the naval flag of Texas until annexation, and was noted for being "beneficial to our [Texan] Navy and Merchantmen" due to its resemblance to the U.S. flag. Despite its unofficial status, the flag remained well known inside the region and internationally as the symbol of Texas. The official blue and gold "Burnet Flag", on the other hand, was little known by Texans, and no contemporary illustrations of it have been discovered except for on the first series 2 dollar note of the Texas Dollar. An 1837 chart of national flags printed in Philadelphia showed the Lone Star and Stripes as the national flag of Texas, and Texas Senator Oliver Jones, who led the 1839 committee which approved the Lone Star Flag, was unaware that the Lone Star and Stripes was not the current official flag. Later, prior to the American Civil War, this flag was carried by Floridian militiamen in Pensacola during the seizure of U.S. property in that city.

The "Come and Take It Flag" was created by the people of Gonzales, featuring the phrase, a black five pointed star, and the image of the town cannon Mexican forces had demanded they turn over. In March 1831, Juan Gomez, a lieutenant in the Mexican Army, granted a small cannon to the colony of San Antonio. It was then transported to Gonzales, Texas and later was the object of Texas pride. At the minor skirmish known as the Battle of Gonzales, a small group of Texans successfully resisted the Mexican forces who had orders to seize their cannon. As a symbol of defiance, the Texans had fashioned a flag containing the phrase along with a black star and an image of the cannon which they had received six years earlier from Mexican officials.

The so-called "Alamo Flag" or "1824 flag" was created by replacing the Eagle in the center of the Mexican tricolor with the year "1824", referencing the 1824 Constitution of Mexico, in support of which Texas was fighting. This was the first flag approved for use by rebel forces by a Texan legislative body. In 1835, the Texan provisional government approved the use of this flag for privateers preying on Mexican commerce. It has often been said that the 1824 flag was flown by Texan forces at the Battle of the Alamo. However, this was never alleged until 1860, long after the battle had occurred. Modern writers have pointed out that the presence of the 1824 flag at the time and place of the battle is highly unlikely. A similar flag was flown at least briefly by Texan Tejano forces, featuring two black, six pointed stars in place of the date. It is likely that the actual "Alamo flag" referred to by accounts of the time was the Lone Star and Stripes, which had been depicted in use at earlier battles such as Goliad, and was widely referred to as the "Texian flag".

The Dodson Tricolor or Dodson flag was designed and sewn by a Mrs. Sarah Dodson during the Revolution. It resembled the flag of Revolutionary France, but with longer proportions and the Texan Lone Star in the canton. Stephen F. Austin was initially so alarmed by the obvious symbolism that he requested the flag not be used, but it nevertheless flew over Texan forces in Cibolo Creek, and may have been the first Texan flag raised over San Antonio. The flag was one of two that flew over the small cabin in which Texas delegates ratified their declaration of independence.

Republic of Texas flags

The Burnet Flag was adopted by the Texan Congress on December 10, 1836.  The name refers David G. Burnet, who was provisional president of the Republic of Texas when the flag was adopted. It consisted of an azure background with a large golden star, inspired by the 1810 "Bonnie Blue Flag" of the Republic of West Florida. Variants of the Burnet Flag with a white star, virtually identical to the Bonnie Blue Flag, were also common. Other variants featured the star (of either color) upside down, and/or ringed with the word TEXAS, with each letter filling one of the gaps of the star.

State flags over Texas

Secession flags of Texas, 1861

In early 1861, between the secession of Texas from the U.S. and its accession to the Confederacy, Texas flew an unofficial, variant flag of Texas with fifteen stars, representing the fifteen slave states. No drawings exist of the flag; there are only imprecise descriptions. The flag may have been based on the state flag or the Bonnie Blue Flag.

Civil War flags 
Various flags used by Texan soldiers during the American Civil War.

Centennial flag of Texas, 1936 
This flag was created for the Texas Centennial Exposition of 1936, a world fair located in Dallas to mark the 100th anniversary of Texas independence.

Urban legend

It is an urban legend that the Texas flag is the only state flag that is allowed to fly at the same height as the U.S. flag. However, the legend is false. Neither the Joint Resolution for Annexing Texas to the United States nor the Ordinance of Annexation contains any provisions regarding flags. According to the United States Flag Code, any state flag can be flown at the same height as the U.S. flag, but the U.S. flag should be on its right (the viewer's left). Consistent with the U.S. Flag Code, the Texas Flag Code specifies that the state flag should either be flown below the U.S. flag if on the same pole or at the same height as the U.S. flag if on separate poles.

Proposed Governor's flag

The Texas governor currently uses a flag consisting of the state coat of arms (a lone star encircled by live oak and olive branches) on a light blue circle, all on a dark blue field with a white star in each corner. The flag has been in use since the late 1960s or early 1970s. The design has never been formally adopted by executive order or legislation. Legislation was introduced to the Texas Legislature in 2007 and 2009 to adopt the 1839 pilot flag/civil ensign of the Republic of Texas as the official flag of the Governor of Texas. While the 2007 bill died in committee, the 2009 bill was passed by the House but died in a Senate committee due to the flag's similarity to the flag of Russia.

Amendments to the Texas Flag Code, signed into law in 1993, authorize the Governor to adopt a flag of his or her own choosing, but this executive authority has not been exercised.

Similar flags

Texas's flag is similar to the flag of Chile, first used in 1817. However, the Chilean flag has a blue canton with a white star rather than the entire left side being blue, with the red bottom stripe begins below the canton.  One author suggests that both the Chilean flag and the Texas flag were designed to look like the flag of the United States from afar while at sea.

Many flags used by municipalities, counties, and other entities in Texas use the same basic scheme as the Texas flag.

See also
 Symbols of the State of Texas
 Six flags over Texas
 World's Largest Texas Flag

References

Further reading

External links

 Texas Flag Code
 Texas Flag status (full-staff or half-staff and instructions for display) 
 Flags of Texas Independence Movements 1835-1836 
 Historical Texas Flags
 Origin of the Lone Star Flag of Texas 
 "Flags and Seals of Texas" by Charles A. Spain Jr., South Texas Law Review
 
 
 The Stewart Myth 
 Official procedure for folding the flag of Texas 

Texas
Symbols of Texas
Texas